D32 is a state road in Gorski Kotar region of Croatia connecting Prezid and nearby border crossing to Slovenia to D3 state road in Delnice, and the road also serves as a connecting road to the A6 motorway as it terminates near Delnice interchange.

The road, as well as all other state roads in Croatia, is managed and maintained by Hrvatske ceste, state owned company.

Traffic volume 

Traffic is regularly counted and reported by Hrvatske ceste, operator of the road. Substantial variations between annual (AADT) and summer (ASDT) traffic volumes are attributed to the fact that the road serves as an approach to the Croatian A6 motorway carrying considerable tourist traffic.

Road junctions and populated areas

Maps

Sources

D032
D032